Spathicarpa hastifolia is a species of flowering plants in the family Araceae, endemic to South America.

Synonyms
 Aropsis palustris
 Spathicarpa cornuta
 Spathicarpa platyspatha
 Spathicarpa sagittifolia
 Spathicarpa sagittifolia var. gardneri
 Spathicarpa sagittifolia var. longicuspis
 Spathicarpa sagittifolia var. platyspatha
 Spathicarpa sagittifolia var. typica

References

 Arctos Database entry
 Bown, Demi (2000). Aroids: Plants of the Arum Family. Timber Press. .

hastifolia